Joshua Allan Nelson (born February 20, 1987) is an American politician and was a Republican member of the West Virginia House of Delegates representing District 23 from January 12, 2013, to January 2016. He did not seek re-election in 2016, instead choosing to run for County Commissioner of Boone County, West Virginia. He was defeated in the general election.

Education
Nelson earned his BS in aeronautics from Liberty University.

Elections
2012: Nelson challenged Democratic delegate Larry Barker (who had been redistricted from District 18) and was unopposed in the Republican primary, held on May 8, 2012, winning with 412 votes. Nelson won the November 6, 2012 general election with 3,985 votes (62.4%), defeating Barker.
2014: Nelson was unopposed in the Republican primary. He defeated Democratic Party challenger Barry Brown and Mountain Party challenger Danny Cook in the general election with 2,411 votes (50.4%).
2016: Nelson ran unopposed in the Republican primary for County Commissioner of Boone County, West Virginia. He was defeated in the general election by Craig Bratcher, taking 3,728 votes to Bratcher's 4,879.

2014 legislative session 
After being re-elected in 2014, Nelson missed the entire 60-day spring session of the West Virginia Legislature while participating in flight training in Texas as part of his duties as a member of the Air National Guard. Although he did not attend the legislative session, he collected a full $15,000 paycheck. Nelson ultimately said that he donated the $15,000 paycheck to local churches and community organizations. Regardless of attendance, West Virginia law requires that legislators be paid $15,000 for a regular legislative session.

References

External links
Official page at the West Virginia Legislature

Joshua Nelson at Ballotpedia
Joshua Nelson at OpenSecrets

Place of birth missing (living people)
1987 births
Living people
Liberty University alumni
Republican Party members of the West Virginia House of Delegates
People from Boone County, West Virginia
United States Marines
21st-century American politicians
West Virginia National Guard personnel